Local elections were held for Lancaster City Council on 7 May 2015, the same day as the 2015 United Kingdom general election and other 2015 United Kingdom local elections. Local elections are held every four years with all councillors up for election in multi-member electoral wards.

Boundary review

The Local Government Boundary Commission for England reviewed the local boundaries of Lancaster council in 2014.

The number of councillors elected to Lancaster will not change although some electoral wards have been redrawn and renamed. The changes are made official by the Lancaster (Electoral Changes) Order 2014.

Election results

Ward results

Bare Ward

Bolton and Slyne Ward

Bulk Ward

Carnforth and Millhead Ward

Castle Ward

Ellel Ward

Halton-with-Aughton ward

Harbour ward

Heysham Central ward

Heysham North ward

Heysham South ward

John O'Gaunt ward

Kellet ward

Lower Lune Valley ward

Marsh Ward

Overton Ward

Poulton ward

Scotforth East ward

Scotforth West ward

Silverdale ward

Skerton East ward

Skerton West ward

Torrisholme ward

University and Scotforth Rural ward

Upper Lune Valley ward

Warton ward

Westgate ward

Wards

See also
Lancaster

References

2015 English local elections
May 2015 events in the United Kingdom
2015
2010s in Lancashire